Itay Talgam (born 24 March 1958, Tel Aviv) is an Israeli conductor and business consultant.

Biography
Itay Talgam studied at the Rubin Academy and received a degree in philosophy from the Hebrew University of Jerusalem. He started out as a pianist, but switched to conducting after his military service in the Israel Defense Forces. He attended a summer course given by Leonard Bernstein in Fontainebleau, France.

Music career
Talgam debuted as an international conductor in 1987, when he was chosen by Leonard Bernstein to appear in a special concert with Orchestre de Paris. Bernstein conducted the second half of the concert. Since then, he has conducted many orchestras in Europe. He was the first Israeli conductor to perform with the St. Petersburg Philharmonic Orchestra and the Leipzig Opera. In Israel, he has conducted and recorded with Israel Philharmonic Orchestra, New Israeli Opera, Jerusalem Symphony Orchestra, Israel Symphony Orchestra Rishon LeZion, Haifa Symphony Orchestra and Israel Chamber Orchestra.He has worked with most of the major orchestras in Israel. Itay Talgam gives seminars and workshops on the operations of the symphony orchestra, which he sees as a metaphor for organizational behavior and a model for inspired leadership.

Awards and recognition
As Music Director of the Tel Aviv Symphony Orchestra and of Musica Nova Consort Talgam won the prize for “Best performance of the year” for Israeli orchestral music, awarded by the National Council for the Arts.

See also
Music of Israel

References

External links 

 Personal Interview with Itay Talgam by media makers @ Leadel.NET
 Lead like the great conductors TED Talk
 Interview with 99FACES.tv
 

Israeli conductors (music)
People from Tel Aviv
1958 births
Living people
21st-century conductors (music)